William Henry Meyer (December 29, 1914 – December 16, 1983) was an American politician and Member of the United States House of Representatives from Vermont.

Biography 
Born in Philadelphia, he attended the public schools of the city and graduated from Pennsylvania State University in 1936. He worked as a timber cruiser, state and federal forester, and Civilian Conservation Corps technician and supervisor in West Virginia, Maryland, Wisconsin and New Jersey from 1936 to 1940. He moved to a farm in Bennington County, Vermont in 1945. He worked with the Soil Conservation Service in Vermont from 1940 to 1950. In 1951, he entered private practice as a consulting forester and became executive director of the Vermont Forest and Farmland Foundation.

He was elected as a Democrat to the Eighty-sixth Congress (January 3, 1959 – January 3, 1961), defeating the Republican candidate, former Governor Harold Arthur. He became the first Democrat to win a statewide or Congressional election in Vermont since the 1850s. He was an unsuccessful candidate for reelection in 1960 to the Eighty-seventh Congress, when he was defeated by Republican Governor Robert Stafford. He served as a consultant for the Technical Review Staff of the Department of the Interior from May 1961 to December 1963.

Meyer was an unsuccessful candidate for the Democratic nomination for United States Senator in 1962, 1964 and 1970. He was a delegate to the Vermont State Democratic conventions of 1956, 1960, 1964 and 1968.

By one measure, Meyer was the most left-wing member to serve in Congress from 1937 to 2002. He was one of the leading founders of the nonviolent socialist Liberty Union Party of Vermont in June 1970. He was their party's nominee for United States Senator after failing to obtain the Democratic nomination that year, receiving 0.91% of the vote.  He was an unsuccessful candidate for election in 1972 to the Ninety-third Congress.

He was a resident of West Rupert, Vermont until his death there. He was cremated and had his ashes interred at his home in West Rupert.

Family 
His son, Karl Meyer, is a noted radical pacifist and tax resister.

References

External links 

1914 births
1983 deaths
American socialists
Civilian Conservation Corps people
Liberty Union Party politicians
Pennsylvania State University alumni
Politicians from Philadelphia
People from Bennington County, Vermont
American foresters
Democratic Party members of the United States House of Representatives from Vermont
20th-century American politicians